Han Geuru (born 29 April 1988) is a South Korean football player who plays as a striker for Daejeon Citizen in the K League. He is also known as Han Geu-loo or Han Geu-roo.

External links 

1988 births
Living people
Association football forwards
South Korean footballers
Seongnam FC players
Daejeon Hana Citizen FC players
K League 1 players
Sportspeople from South Gyeongsang Province